Catherine Drinker Bowen (January 1, 1897 – November 1, 1973) was an American writer best known for her biographies. She won the National Book Award for Nonfiction in 1958.

Biography
Bowen was born Catherine Drinker on the Haverford College campus in Haverford, Pennsylvania, on January 1, 1897, to a prominent Quaker family. She was an accomplished violinist who studied for a musical career at the Peabody Institute and the Juilliard School of Music, but ultimately decided to become a writer. She had no formal writing education and no academic career, but became a bestselling American biographer and writer despite criticism from academics. Her earliest biographies were about musicians. Bowen did all her own research, without hiring research assistants, and sometimes took the controversial step of interviewing subjects without taking notes. A number of Bowen's books were chosen as Book of the Month Club selections, including Beloved Friend (1937), Yankee from Olympus (1944) and John Adams and the American Revolution (1950).

In 1958 she won the U.S. National Book Award for Nonfiction for The Lion and the Throne: The Life and Times of Sir Edward Coke (1552–1634), a biography of the prominent lawyer of Elizabethan England. That same year, she was elected to the American Philosophical Society. In addition, Ms. Bowen received the 1957 Philadelphia Award and the 1962 Women's National Book Association award. Her last book, Family Portrait, received critical acclaim, and was a Literary Guild selection. During her lifetime, she was the recipient of numerous awards, including the Philadelphia Award. In 1962, she became the first woman to receive an honorary degree from Lehigh University.

Bowen was an active amateur chamber music player, often playing violin with members of her family and with friends. She recorded her experiences playing chamber music in her book Friends and Fiddlers. She was one of the founding members of the Amateur Chamber Music Players (today Associated Chamber Music Players), an international organization encouraging amateur music-making.

At the time of Bowen's death in 1973, she was working on a biography of Benjamin Franklin; the unfinished book was published posthumously as Scenes from the Life of its subject.  She died in Haverford and is buried in West Laurel Hill Cemetery in Bala Cynwyd, Pennsylvania.

Family
Catherine was the daughter of Henry Sturgis Drinker, who later became president of Lehigh University. She had four brothers, Henry ("Harry"), an attorney who lent his name to the large Philadelphia-based law firm Drinker Biddle & Reath (now Faegre Drinker), and who was also a chamber music composer and conductor; Jim; Cecil, the founder of the Harvard School of Public Health; and Philip, inventor of the iron lung; and a sister, Ernesta. Catherine's aunt on her father's side was artist Catherine Ann Drinker and on her mother's side noted portraitist Cecilia Beaux.

Catherine Drinker married Ezra Bowen, the Chair of Economics at Lehigh University and the author of Social Economics in 1919. They divorced in the 1930s. Catherine married her second husband, Thomas McKean Downs, a surgeon, in 1939. She had two children from her first marriage: Catherine Prince and Ezra Bowen. Ezra went on to become a writer and editor for Sports Illustrated and Time Life. One of her two biological grandsons, Matthew, is an author of creative non-fiction, stage / screenplays, and scholarly articles germane to his field of neuropsychology.

Selected works
 The Story of the Oak Tree (Easton, PA: Chemical Publishing Co., 1924)
 A History of Lehigh University (South Bethlehem, PA: Lehigh Alumni Bulletin, 1924)
 Rufus Starbuck's Wife (New York: Putnam, 1932)
 Friends and Fiddlers (Boston: Little, Brown and Company, 1935)
 Beloved Friend: The Story of Tchaikowsky and Nadejda Von Meck (New York: Random House, 1937)
 Free artist: The story of Anton and Nicholas Rubinstein (New York: Random House, 1939)
 Yankee from Olympus: Justice Holmes and His Family (Boston: Little, Brown and Company, 1944)
 John Adams and the American Revolution (Boston: Little, Brown and Company, 1950)
 The writing of biography (Boston: 1951)
 The Lion and the Throne: The Life and Times of Sir Edward Coke (Boston: Little, Brown and Company, 1957)
 Lord of the Law (New York: American Heritage Publishing Co., 1957)
 Adventures of a Biographer (Boston: Little, Brown and Company, 1959)
 Bernard DeVoto: Historian, critic, and fighter (Boston: Little Brown and Company, 1960)
 Francis Bacon: The Temper of a Man (Boston: Little, Brown and Company, 1963)
 Miracle at Philadelphia: The Story of the Constitutional Convention, May to September 1787 (Boston: Little, Brown and Company, 1966), which is #54 on list of books in the most number of American Libraries. 
 Biography: The Craft and the Calling (Boston: Little, Brown and Company, 1968)
 Family Portrait (Boston: Little, Brown and Company, 1970)
 The Most Dangerous Man in America: Scenes from the Life of Benjamin Franklin (Boston: Little, Brown, and Company, 1974)

References

    Giffuni, Cathe.  "Catherine Drinker Bowen: A Bibliography,"  Bulletin of Bibliography, Vol. 50 No. 4 December 1993, pp. 331–337.

External links
Finding Aid for the Catherine Drinker Bowen Papers, Library of Congress
Portrait at the University of Pennsylvania
Biography at West Laurel Hill Cemetery web site

1897 births
1973 deaths
20th-century American biographers
American women biographers
National Book Award winners
People from Montgomery County, Pennsylvania
American Quakers
Burials at West Laurel Hill Cemetery
20th-century American violinists
20th-century American women writers
Drinker family
Members of the American Academy of Arts and Letters